Maia Nedara Cabrera Mamann (born 17 July 1999) is an American-born Israeli–Dominican footballer who plays as a midfielder for Women's Premier Soccer League club SUSA FC and the Dominican Republic women's national team.

Early life
Cabrera was raised in Rego Park, New York to a Dominican father and an Israeli mother. She is Jewish.

High school and college career
Cabrera has attended the Forest Hills High School in Forest Hills, New York and the St. John's University in New York City, New York.

Club career
Cabrera has played for Long Island Fury and SUSA FC in the Women's Premier Soccer League.

International career
Cabrera represented Israel at the 2015 UEFA Women's Under-19 Championship and three UEFA Women's Under-19 Championship qualifications (2016, 2017 and 2018). She made her senior debut for the Dominican Republic on 7 July 2021 as a 58th-minute substitution in a 0–1 friendly loss to Nicaragua.

References

External links

1999 births
Living people
Citizens of the Dominican Republic through descent
Dominican Republic women's footballers
Women's association football midfielders
Dominican Republic women's international footballers
Dominican Republic Jews
Dominican Republic people of Jewish descent
Jewish footballers
Jewish sportswomen
Dominican Republic people of Israeli descent
People with acquired Israeli citizenship
Israeli women's footballers
Israeli people of Dominican Republic descent
Jewish Israeli sportspeople
People from Rego Park, Queens
Sportspeople from Queens, New York
Soccer players from New York City
American women's soccer players
Forest Hills High School (New York) alumni
St. John's Red Storm women's soccer players
Long Island Fury players
Women's Premier Soccer League players
American sportspeople of Dominican Republic descent
American people of Israeli descent
Jewish American sportspeople
21st-century American Jews
21st-century American women